West Wales is not clearly defined as a particular region of Wales. Some definitions of West Wales include only Pembrokeshire, Ceredigion and Carmarthenshire, which historically comprised the Welsh principality of Deheubarth and was called "South West Wales" in the Nomenclature of Territorial Units for Statistics (NUTS). Other definitions may include Swansea and Neath Port Talbot but exclude Ceredigion, although this definition may also be described as South West Wales. The "West Wales and the Valleys" NUTS area includes more westerly parts of North Wales.

The preserved county of Dyfed covers what is generally considered to be West Wales; between 1974 and 1996, Dyfed was a county, with a county council and six district councils.

Historic use
Historically, the term West Wales was applied to the Kingdom of Cornwall during the Anglo-Saxon invasion of Britain and the period of the Heptarchy. The Old English word Wealas, a Germanic term for inhabitants of the Western Roman Empire, which the Anglo-Saxons came to apply especially to the Britons, gave its name to Wales and is also the origin of the second syllable in the name Cornwall.

Railways

Mainlines
West Wales Line
Heart of Wales Line
Cambrian Line

Heritage lines
Gwili Railway
Llanelli and Mynydd Mawr Railway
Teifi Valley Railway
Vale of Rheidol Railway

See also
Geography of Wales
Kingdom of Dyfed
Mid Wales
North Wales
Principality of Deheubarth
South Wales
South West Wales
Traws Link Cymru
West Wales Raiders

Notes

Regions of Wales
NUTS 2 statistical regions of the United Kingdom